Pilchowice  is a village in the administrative district of Gmina Wleń, within Lwówek Śląski County, Lower Silesian Voivodeship, in south-western Poland. It is part of the historical region of Silesia and was administered by Germany until 1945.

References

Pilchowice